Presidential elections were held in Brazil on 1 March 1910. The result was a victory for Hermes da Fonseca, who received 57.1% of the vote. Fonseca was supported by several of the most influential Republican parties, whilst his main opponent Ruy Barbosa was supported by the Civilist Campaign, a movement opposed to da Fonseca. After the election da Fonseca was also supported by the Conservative Republican Party.

Results

References

Presidential elections in Brazil
Brazil
1910 in Brazil
Brazil
Election and referendum articles with incomplete results
Elections of the First Brazilian Republic